A checkerboard (American English) or chequerboard (British English; see spelling differences) is a board of checkered pattern on which checkers (also known as English draughts) is played. Most commonly, it consists of 64 squares (8×8) of alternating dark and light color, typically green and buff (official tournaments), black and red (consumer commercial), or black and white (printed diagrams). An 8×8 checkerboard is used to play many other games, including chess, whereby it is known as a chessboard. Other rectangular square-tiled boards are also often called checkerboards.

Games and puzzles using checkerboards

Martin Gardner featured puzzles based on checkerboards in his November 1962 Mathematical Games column in Scientific American. A square checkerboard with an alternating pattern is used for games including:
 Amazons
 Chapayev
 Chess and some of its variants (see chessboard)
 Czech draughts
 Draughts, also known as checkers
 Fox games
 Frisian draughts
 Gounki
 International draughts
 Italian draughts
 Lines of Action
 Pool checkers
 Russian checkers

The following games require an 8×8 board and are sometimes played on a chessboard.
 Arimaa
 Breakthrough
 Crossings
 Mak-yek
 Makruk
 Martian Chess

Mathematical description
Given a grid with  rows and  columns, a function ,

or, alternatively,

The element  is black and represents the lower left corner of the board.

Gallery

See also
 Chessboard

References

Draughts
Game equipment